Makram Jamil Khoury (Arabic:|مكرم يعقوب خوري})  is an Arab-Israeli actor, born 30 May 1945 in Jerusalem. He was the youngest artist and the first Arab to win the Israel Prize, the highest civic honor in Israel.

Biography
Makram J. Khoury was born  into a Palestinian-Christian family, in the al-Sheikh Jarrah section of Jerusalem to his father, who was a judge, and his mother, a teacher. The Khoury family fled to Lebanon during 1948 Arab-Israeli War. A year later, they returned to what had become the new State of Israel. The family took up residence in the port city of Acre, near Haifa. Educated there and in the nearby village of Kufr Yasif, Khoury finished high school in 1963. He then entered the Hebrew University of Jerusalem but later dropped out and pursued a career as an actor.

His eldest daughter, Clara Khoury, is also an actress in Israel. She appeared in three films that garnered international attention: Rana’s Wedding (2002), The Syrian Bride (she played the daughter of the character played by Makram) (2004) and Lipstikka (2011). His son Jameel Khoury is also an actor, and appeared in Ridley Scott's film Body of Lies (2008).

Acting career
Khoury trained in Israel. In 1970-1973 he studied at the Mountview Academy of Theatre Arts in London, England. He later became involved with the Cameri Theater in Tel Aviv and the Haifa Municipal Theater, continuing as a member of the latter for twenty years.

Makram  returned to Haifa following a year-long tour playing Tierno Bokar in Peter Brook's 11 and 12.

Filmography

Film 

1979:  (by Joel Silberg)
1982:  (by ) - Detective chief inspector Ben-Shooshan
1983:  (TV Mini-Series, by ) - Michel
1984:  (by )
1985:  (by )
1986:  (by Shimon Dotan) - Col. Moshe Katzman
1987: Wedding in Galilee - The governor
1989:  (by ) - Anton
1990: Torn Apart - Mahmoud Malek
1990:  (by Michel Khleifi)
1992:  (by Amos Kollek) - Ahmed Shafik
1994:  (by Eric Rochant) - Barak
1995: The Tale of the Three Lost Jewels (by Michel Khleifi) - Abu Iman
1997:  (by Ali Nasser) - Mukhtar
2001: The Body (by Jonas McCord) - Nasir Hamid
2003:  (by) - Ezra
2004: The Syrian Bride (by Eran Riklis) - Hammed
2005: Free Zone (by Amos Gitai) - Samir aka "The American"
2005: Munich (by Steven Spielberg) - Wael Zwaiter
2006: Forgiveness (by Udi Aloni) - Dr. Isaac Shemesh
2006: Djihad! (TV Movie) - 
2008:  (by Eran Riklis) - Abu Kamal
2009: Italians (by Giovanni Veronesi) - Hamed (first segment)
2009:  (by Amos Gitai)
2010: Miral (by Julian Schnabel) - Governor Khatib
2012: The Inheritance (by Hiam Abbass) - Abu Majd
2013: Complicit (TV Movie, by Niall MacCormick) - Colonel Hazem Ashraf
2013: Farewell Baghdad - Nouri El Saeed
2013:  - Salach
2013: The Physician - Imam
2014: Magic Men - Avraham Kofinas
2014: Desert Dancer (by Richard Raymond) - Mehdi
2014: The Cut - Omar Nasreddin
2014:  - Mafous
2015: A Tale of Love and Darkness (by Natalie Portman) - Al Hilwani
2015: Wounded Land
2015:  by  - Hani
2016: Everything is Broken up and Dances - Shlomi
2017: Unlocked - Yazid Khaleel
2017: Wajib
2018: The Tower
2018:  - Voice Over
2019: Spider in the Web - 
Nader

2020: Laila in Haifa

Theater

Television

Awards and recogition
 1987 : Khoury was awarded the Israel Prize for acting.

See also
List of Israel Prize recipients
Palestinian Christians

References

External links 
 
 Review of Peter Brook's: 11 and 12
 Review of Peter Brook's: 11 and 12
 Syrian Bride Official Site
 Forgiveness Official Site
 Barbican Theater
 Clara Khoury

1945 births
Living people
Israel Prize in theatre recipients
Palestinian male actors
Israeli Arab Christians
Israeli male film actors
Israeli male stage actors
Israeli male television actors
Palestinian male film actors
Palestinian television actors
Arab citizens of Israel